Grand Bend Motorplex is a dedicated multi-use motorsports facility located southeast of Grand Bend, Ontario, Canada. It features IHRA Championship Drag Racing on its 1/4 mile dragstrip as well as two competitive Motorcross tracks and is home of the annual IHRA Mopar Canadian Nationals, Canada's longest running and largest National Event Drag race.

Special features include concerts with some of Canada's recording stars and an onsite motorhome area and camping compound. The park also includes a dedicated kid's play area, multiple washroom and shower buildings, souvenir store and four separate concession buildings serving a variety of food.

See also
 List of auto racing tracks in Canada
 Grand Bend Airport

References

External links
Grand Bend Motorplex
Grand Bend Motorplex - Drag Strip
Grand Bend Raceway - Road Course
Grand Bend Speedway - Tri-Oval
Grand Bend Motocross
Grand Bend Visitor Guide

Motorsport venues in Ontario
Drag racing venues in Canada
IHRA drag racing venues
Motocross racing venues in Canada
Paved oval racing venues in Ontario
Road racing venues in Canada